Persian Jews or Iranian Jews (Yâhudiyān-e-Irāni;  Yəhūdīm Parsīm) are the descendants of Jews who were historically associated with the Persian Empire, whose successor state is Iran. The biblical books of Esther, Isaiah, Daniel, Ezra, and Nehemiah contain references to the lives and experiences of Jews who lived in Persia. Dating back to biblical times, Iranian Jews constitute one of the world's oldest and most historically significant Jewish communities. Jews have had a continuous presence in Iran since the time of Cyrus the Great of the Achaemenid Empire. Cyrus invaded Babylon and freed the Jews from the Babylonian captivity.

Today, the vast majority of Persian Jews live in Israel and the United States, especially in Los Angeles, Beverly Hills, and on the North Shore of Long Island. There are smaller Persian Jewish communities in Baltimore, Maryland and the Twin Cities. According to the latest Iranian census, the remaining Jewish population of Iran was 9,826 in 2016; a population website numbers the Jews In Iran as 8,500 in 2021.

Terminology
Today, the term Iranian Jews is mostly used in reference to Jews who are from the country of Iran. In various scholarly and historical texts, the term is used in reference to Jews who speak various Iranian languages. Iranian immigrants in Israel (nearly all of whom are Jewish) are referred to as Parsim (a term which means "Persians"). In Iran, Persian Jews and Jewish people in general are both described with four common terms: Kalīmī, which is considered the most proper term; Yahūdī, which is less formal but correct; Yīsrael the term by which Jewish people refer to themselves; and Johūd, a term having negative connotations and considered by many Jews as offensive.

History

Jews had been residing in Persia since around 727 BCE, having arrived in the region as slaves after being captured by the Assyrian and Babylonian kings. According to one Jewish legend, the first Jew to enter Persia was Sarah bat Asher, grand daughter of the Patriarch Jacob. The biblical books of Isaiah, Daniel, Ezra, Nehemiah, Chronicles, and Esther contain references to the life and experiences of Jews in Persia and accounts of their relations with the Persian kings. In the book of Ezra, the Persian kings are credited with permitting and enabling the Jews to return to Jerusalem and rebuild their Temple; its reconstruction was effected "according to the decree of Cyrus, and Darius, and Artaxerxes king of Persia" (Ezra 6:14). This great event in Jewish history took place in the late sixth-century BCE, by which time there was a well-established and influential Jewish community in Persia.

Jews in ancient Persia mostly lived in their own communities. Persian Jews lived in the ancient (and until the mid-20th century still extant) communities not only of Iran, but also the Armenian, Georgian, Iraqi, Bukharan, and Mountain Jewish communities.

Some of the communities have been isolated from other Jewish communities, to the extent that their classification as "Persian Jews" is a matter of linguistic or geographical convenience rather than actual historical relationship with one another. Scholars believe that during the peak of the Persian Empire, Jews may have comprised as much as 20% of the population.

According to Encyclopædia Britannica: "The Jews trace their heritage in Iran to the Babylonian Exile of the 6th century BC and, like the Armenians, have retained their ethnic, linguistic, and religious identity." But the Library of Congress's country study on Iran states that "Over the centuries the Jews of Iran became physically, culturally, and linguistically indistinguishable from the non-Jewish population. The overwhelming majority of Jews speak Persian as their mother language, and a tiny minority, Kurdish."

Under the Achaemenids

Cyrus the Great and Jews

According to the biblical account Cyrus the Great was "God's anointed", having freed the Jews from Babylonian rule. After the conquest of Babylonia by the Persian Achaemenid Empire, Cyrus granted all the Jews citizenship. Though he allowed the Jews to return to Israel (around 537 BCE), many chose to remain in Persia. Thus, the events of the Book of Esther are set entirely in Iran. Various biblical accounts say that over forty thousand Jews did return (See Jehoiakim, Ezra, Nehemiah, and Jews).

The historical nature of the "Cyrus decree" has been challenged. Professor Lester L Grabbe argues that there was no decree, but that there was a policy that allowed exiles to return to their homelands and rebuild their temples. He also argues that the archaeology suggests that the return was a "trickle", taking place over perhaps decades, resulting in a maximum population of perhaps 30,000. Philip R. Davies called the authenticity of the decree "dubious", citing Grabbe. Arguing against the authenticity of Ezra 1.1–4 is J. Briend, in a paper given at the Institut Catholique de Paris on 15 December 1993, who denies that it resembles the form of an official document but reflects rather the biblical prophetic idiom."

Mary Joan Winn Leith believes that the decree in Ezra might be authentic and, along with the Cyrus Cylinder, that Cyrus, like earlier rulers, was through these decrees trying to gain support from those who might be strategically important, particularly those close to Egypt which Cyrus wished to conquer. She also wrote that "appeals to Marduk in the cylinder and to Yahweh in the biblical decree demonstrate the Persian tendency to co-opt local religious and political traditions in the interest of imperial control."

By some accounts, the tomb of the prophet Daniel is located in Susa. The Second Temple was eventually (re)built in Jerusalem, with assistance from the Persians, and the Israelites assumed an important position in the Silk Road trade with China.

Under Darius

Cyrus ordered rebuilding the Second Temple in the same place as the first; however, he died before it was completed. Darius the Great came to power in the Persian empire and ordered the completion of the temple. According to the Bible, the prophets Haggai and Zechariah urged this work. The temple was ready for consecration in the spring of 515 BCE, more than twenty years after the Jews' return to Jerusalem.

Under Ahasuerus
According to the Book of Esther, in the Tanakh, Haman was an Agagite noble and vizier of the empire under Persian King Ahasuerus, generally identified as Xerxes the Great (son of Darius the Great) in the 6th century BCE. According to the story, Haman and his wife Zeresh instigated a plot to kill all the Jews of ancient Persia. The plot was foiled by Queen Esther, the Jewish Queen of Persia. As a result, Ahasuerus ordered the hanging of Haman and his ten sons. The events of the Book of Esther are celebrated as the holiday of Purim.

Parthian period

Jewish sources contain no mention of the Parthian influence; "Parthia" does not appear in the texts. The Armenian prince Sanatroces, of the royal house of the Arsacides, is mentioned in the "Small Chronicle" as one of the successors (diadochoi) of Alexander. Among other Asiatic princes, the Roman rescript in favor of the Jews reached Arsaces as well (I Macc. xv. 22); it is not, however, specified which Arsaces. Not long after this, the Partho-Babylonian country was trodden by the army of a Jewish prince; the Syrian king, Antiochus Sidetes, marched, in company with Hyrcanus I., against the Parthians; and when the allied armies defeated the Parthians (129 BCE) at the Great Zab (Lycus), the king ordered a halt of two days on account of the Jewish Sabbath and Feast of Weeks. In 40 BCE the Jewish puppet-king, Hyrcanus II., fell into the hands of the Parthians, who, according to their custom, cut off his ears in order to render him unfit for rulership. The Jews of Babylonia, it seems, had the intention of founding a high-priesthood for the exiled Hyrcanus, which they would have made quite independent of the Land of Israel. But the reverse was to come about: the Judeans received a Babylonian, Ananel by name, as their high priest, which indicates the importance enjoyed by the Jews of Babylonia.

The Parthian Empire was based on a loosely configured system of vassal kings. The lack of rigidly centralized rule over the empire had drawbacks, for instance, allowing the rise of a Jewish robber-state in Nehardea (see Anilai and Asinai). Yet, the tolerance of the Arsacid dynasty was as legendary as that of the first Persian dynasty, the Achaemenids. One account suggests the conversion of a small number of Parthian vassal kings of Adiabene to Judaism. These instances and others show not only the tolerance of Parthian kings, but are also a testament to the extent at which the Parthians saw themselves as the heir to the preceding empire of Cyrus the Great. So protective were the Parthians of the minority over whom they ruled, that an old Jewish saying tells, "When you see a Parthian charger tied up to a tomb-stone in the Land of Israel, the hour of the Messiah will be near".

The Babylonian Jews wanted to fight in common cause with their Judean brethren against Vespasian; but it was not until the Romans waged war under Trajan against Parthia that they made their hatred felt; so, the revolt of the Babylonian Jews helped prevent Rome from becoming master there. Philo speaks of the numerous Jews resident in that country, a population that was likely increased by immigrants after the destruction of Jerusalem. In Jerusalem from early times, Jews had looked to the east for help. With the fall of Jerusalem, Babylonia became a kind of bulwark of Judaism. The collapse of the Bar Kochba revolt likely also added to Jewish refugees in Babylon.

In the struggles between the Parthians and the Romans, the Jews had reason to side with the Parthians, their protectors. Parthian kings elevated the princes of the Exile to a kind of nobility, called Resh Galuta. Until then they had used the Jews as collectors of revenue. The Parthians may have given them recognition for services, especially by the Davidic house. Establishment of the Resh Galuta provided a central authority over the numerous Jewish subjects, who proceeded to develop their own internal affairs.

Sassanian period (226–634 CE)

By the early third century, Persian Empire influences were on the rise again. In the winter of 226 CE, Ardashir I overthrew the last Parthian king (Artabanus IV), destroyed the rule of the Arsacids, and founded the dynasty of the Sassanids. While Hellenistic influence had been felt amongst the religiously tolerant Parthians, the Sassanids intensified the Persian side of life, favored the Pahlavi language, and restored the old dualistic religion of Zoroastrianism which became the official state religion. This resulted in the suppression of other religions. A priestly Zoroastrian inscription from the time of King Bahram II (276–293 CE) contains a list of religions (including Judaism, Christianity, Buddhism, Hinduism etc.) that Sassanid rule claimed to have "smashed". "The false doctrines of Ahriman and of the idols suffered great blows and lost credibility. The Jews (Yahud), Buddhists (Shaman), Hindus (Brahman), Nazarenes (Nasara), Christians (Kristiyan), Baptists (Makdag) and Manichaeans (Zandik) were smashed in the empire, their idols destroyed, and the habitations of the idols annihilated and turned into abodes and seats of the gods"."

Shapur I (or Shvor Malka, which is the Aramaic form of the name) was friendly to the Jews. His friendship with Shmuel gained many advantages for the Jewish community. Shapur II's mother Ifra Hormizd was Judaizing believer (i.e. believer in Judaism), and this gave the Jewish community relative freedom of religion and many advantages. He was also friend of a Babylonian rabbi in the Talmud named Raba, Raba's friendship with Shapur II enabled him to secure a relaxation of the oppressive laws enacted against the Jews in the Persian Empire. In addition, Raba sometimes referred to his top student Abaye with the term Shvur Malka meaning "Shapur [the] King" because of his bright and quick intellect.

Early Islamic period (634–1255)
With the Islamic conquest of Persia, the government assigned Jews, along with Christians and Zoroastrians, to the status of dhimmis, non-Muslim subjects of the Islamic empire. Dhimmis were allowed to practice their religion, but were required to pay jizya to cover the cost of financial welfare, security and other benefits that Muslims were entitled to
(jizya, a poll tax, and initially also kharaj, a land tax) in place of the zakat, which the Muslim population was required to pay. Like other Dhimmis, Jews were exempt from military draft. Viewed as "People of the Book", they had some status as fellow monotheists, though they were treated differently depending on the ruler at the time. On the one hand, Jews were granted significant economic and religious freedom when compared to their co-religionists in European nations during these centuries. Many served as doctors, scholars, and craftsman, and gained positions of influence in society. On the other hand, like other non-Muslims, they were treated as somewhat inferior.

Mongol rule (1256–1318)
In 1255, Mongols led by Hulagu Khan invaded parts of Persia, and in 1258 they captured Baghdad putting an end to the Abbasid caliphate. In Persia and surrounding areas, the Mongols established a division of the Mongol Empire known as the Ilkhanate, building a capital city in Tabriz. The Ilkhanate Mongol rulers abolished the inequality of dhimmis, and all religions were deemed equal. It was shortly after this time when one of the Ilkhanate rulers, Arghun Khan, preferred Jews for the administrative positions and appointed Sa'd al-Daula, a Jew, as his vizier. The appointment, however, provoked resentment from the Muslim clergy, and after Arghun's death in 1291, al-Daula was murdered and Persian Jews in Tabriz suffered a period of violent persecutions from the Muslim populace instigated by the clergy. The Orthodox Christian historian Bar Hebraeus wrote that the violence committed against the Jews during that period "neither tongue can utter, nor the pen write down".

Ghazan Khan's conversion to Islam in 1295 heralded for Persian Jews in Tabriz a pronounced turn for the worse, as they were once again relegated to the status of dhimmis (Covenant of Omar). Öljeitü, Ghazan Khan's successor, destroyed many synagogues and decreed that Jews had to wear a distinctive mark on their heads; Christians endured similar persecutions. Under pressure, many Jews converted to Islam. The most famous such convert was Rashid-al-Din Hamadani, a physician of Hamadani origin who was also a historian and statesman; and who adopted Islam in order to advance his career in Öljeitü's court in Tabriz. However, in 1318 he was executed on charges of poisoning Öljeitü and his severed head was carried around the streets of Tabriz, chanting, "This is the head of the Jew who abused the name of God; may God's curse be upon him!" About 100 years later, Miranshah destroyed Rashid al-Din's tomb, and his remains were reburied at the Jewish cemetery.

In 1383, Timur Lenk started the military conquest of Persia. He captured Herat, Khorasan and all eastern Persia to 1385 and massacred almost all inhabitants of Neishapur and other Iranian cities. When revolts broke out in Persia, he ruthlessly suppressed them, massacring the populations of whole cities. When Timur plundered Persia its artists and artisans were deported to embellish Timur's capital Samarkand. Skilled Persian Jews were imported to develop the empire's textile industry.

Safavid, Afsharid and Qajar dynasties (1502–1925)

During the reign of the Safavids (1502–1794), they proclaimed Shi'a Islam the state religion. This led to a deterioration in their treatment of Persian Jews. Safavids Shi'ism assigns importance to the issues of ritual purity – tahara. Non-Muslims, including Jews, are deemed to be ritually unclean – najis. Any physical contact would require Shi'as to undertake ritual purification before doing regular prayers. Thus, Persian rulers, and the general populace, sought to limit physical contact between Muslims and Jews. Jews were excluded from public baths used by Muslims. They were forbidden to go outside during rain or snow, as an "impurity" could be washed from them upon a Muslim.

The reign of Shah Abbas I (1588–1629) was initially benign; Jews prospered throughout Persia and were encouraged to settle in Isfahan, which was made a new capital. Toward the end of his rule, treatment of Jews became more harsh. Shi'a clergy (including a Jewish convert) persuaded the shah to require Jews to wear a distinctive badge on clothing and headgear. In 1656, the shah ordered the expulsion from Isfahan of all Jews because of the common belief of their "impurity". They were forced to convert to Islam. The treasury suffered from the loss of jizya collected from the Jews. People rumored that the converts continued to practice Judaism in secret. For whatever reason, the government in 1661 allowed Jews to take up their old religion, but still required them to wear a distinctive patch upon their clothing.

Nadir Shah (1736–1747) allowed Jews to settle in the Shi'ite holy city of Mashhad. However, following his murder many Jews were massacred in Mashhad, and survivors were forcibly converted, in an event known as Allahdad incident. they become known as "Jadid al-Islams" (new converts) and appeared to superficially accept the new religion, but in fact lived their lives as Crypto-Jews. The community permanently left Iran in 1946 and still lives as a tightly knit community in Israel today.

Bābāʾī ben Nūrīʾel, a ḥāḵām (rabbi) from Isfahan who, at the behest of Nāder Shah Afšār (r. 1148–60/1736–47), translated the Pentateuch and the Psalms of David from Hebrew into Persian. Three other rabbis helped him in the translation, which was begun in Rabīʿ II, 1153/May, 1740, and completed in Jomādā I, 1154/June, 1741. At the same time, eight Muslim mollas and three European and five Armenian priests translated the Koran and the Gospels. The commission was supervised by Mīrzā Moḥammad Mahdī Khan Monšī, the court historiographer and author of the Tārīḵ-ejahāngošā-ye nāderī. Finished translations were presented to Nāder Shah in Qazvīn in June, 1741, who, however, was not impressed. There had been previous translations of the Jewish holy books into Persian, but Bābāʾī's translation is notable for the accuracy of the Persian equivalents of Hebrew words, which has made it the subject of study by linguists. Bābāʾī's introduction to the translation of the Psalms of David is unique, and sheds a certain amount of light on the teaching methods of Iranian Jewish schools in eighteenth-century Iran. He is not known to have written anything else.

The advent of a Shi'a Qajar dynasty in 1794 brought back the earlier persecutions.

Lord Curzon described 19th-century regional differences in the situation of the Persian Jews: "In Isfahan, where they are said to be 3,700 and where they occupy a relatively better status than elsewhere in Persia, they are not permitted to wear kolah or Persian headdress, to have shops in the bazaar, to build the walls of their houses as high as a Moslem neighbour's, or to ride in the street. In Teheran and Kashan they are also to be found in large numbers and enjoying a fair position. In Shiraz they are very badly off. In Bushire they are prosperous and free from persecution."

In the 19th century, the colonial powers from Europe began noting numerous forced conversions and massacres, usually generated by Shi'a clergy. Two major blood-libel conspiracies had taken place during this period, one in Shiraz and the other in Tabriz. In 1830, a blood-libel had wiped out the Jewish population of Tabriz; a power struggle over influence between Jewish and Christian minorities led the Armenians to kidnap and murder a Muslim child from a prominent family, delivering the body to the chief secretary claiming that the Jews had murdered and drank the blood of the child for Passover.   A document recorded after the incident states that the Jews faced two options, conversion to Islam or death. Amidst the chaos, Jews had converted, but most refused to convert to Islam – described within the document was a boy of age 16 named Yahyia who refused to convert to Islam, he was subsequently killed. The same year saw a forcible conversion of the Jews of Shiraz over a similar incident. In addition to the Allahdad incident mentioned above in 1839. European travellers reported that the Jews of Tabriz and Shiraz continued to practice Judaism in secret despite a fear of further persecutions. Famous Iranian-Jewish teachers such as Mullah Daoud Chadi continued to teach and preach Judaism, inspiring Jews throughout the nation. Jews of Barforush, Mazandaran were forcibly converted in 1866. When the French and British ambassadors intervened to allow them to practice their traditional religion, a mob killed 18 Jews of Barforush. Perhaps these things happened earlier too, but went unnoticed by the historians.

In the middle of the 19th century, J. J. Benjamin wrote about the life of Persian Jews, describing conditions and beliefs that went back to the 16th century:

A group of Persian Jewish refugees from Mashhad, escaping persecution back home in Qajar Persia, were granted rights to settle in the Sikh Empire around the year 1839. Most of the Jewish families settled in Rawalpindi (specifically in the Babu Mohallah neighbourhood) and Peshawar.

In 1894, a representative of the Alliance Israélite Universelle, a Jewish humanitarian and educational organization, wrote from Tehran: "…every time that a priest wishes to emerge from obscurity and win a reputation for piety, he preaches war against the Jews".

In 1901, The Riot of Shaykh Ibrahim was sparked against the Jews of Tehran. An Imam began speaking on the importance of ridding alcohol for the sake of Islamic purity, he soon gained followers and this soon manifested itself into an assault against Jews for refusing to give up the wine they drank for sabbath.

In 1910, Muslims rumored that the Jews of Shiraz had ritually murdered a Muslim girl. Muslims plundered the whole Jewish quarter. The first to start looting were soldiers sent by the local governor to defend the Jews against the enraged mob. Twelve Jews who tried to defend their property were killed, and many others were injured. Representatives of the Alliance Israélite Universelle recorded numerous instances of persecution and debasement of Persian Jews. In the late 19th to early 20th century, thousands of Persian Jews immigrated to the territory of present-day Israel within the Ottoman Empire to escape such persecution.

Pahlavi dynasty (1925–1979)
The Pahlavi dynasty implemented modernizing reforms, which greatly improved the life of Jews. The influence of the Shi'a clergy was weakened, and the restrictions on Jews and other religious minorities were abolished. According to Charles Recknagel and Azam Gorgin of Radio Free Europe, during the reign of Reza Shah "the political and social conditions of the Jews changed fundamentally. Reza Shah prohibited mass conversion of Jews and eliminated the concept of uncleanness of non-Muslims. He allowed incorporation of modern Hebrew into the curriculum of Jewish schools and publication of Jewish newspapers. Jews were also allowed to hold government jobs. Reza Shah's ascent brought temporary relief to Jews. In the 1920s, Jewish schools were closed again. In the 1930s, "Reza Shah's pro-Nazi sympathies seriously threatened Iranian Jewry. There were no persecutions of the Jews, but, as with other minorities, anti-Jewish articles were published in the media. Unlike religiously motivated prejudice, anti-Jewish sentiments acquired an ethnonational character, a direct import from Germany."

At the time of the establishment of the state of Israel in 1948, there were approximately 140,000–150,000 Jews living in Iran, the historical center of Persian Jewry. Over 95% have since migrated abroad.

The violence and disruption in Arab life associated with the founding of Israel and its victory in the 1948 Arab–Israeli War drove increased anti-Jewish sentiment in Iran. This continued until 1953, in part because of the weakening of the central government and strengthening of clergy in the political struggles between the shah and prime minister Mohammad Mossadegh. From 1948 to 1953, about one-third of Iranian Jews, most of them poor, immigrated to Israel. David Littman puts the total figure of Iranian Jews who immigrated to Israel between 1948 and 1978 at 70,000.

After the deposition of Mossadegh in 1953, the reign of shah Mohammad Reza Pahlavi was the most prosperous era for the Jews of Iran. By the 1970s, only 1% of Iranian Jews were classified as lower class; 80% were middle class and 10% wealthy. Although Jews accounted for only a small percentage of Iran's population, in 1979 two of the 18 members of the Iranian Academy of Sciences, 80 of the 4,000 university lecturers, and 600 of the 10,000 physicians in Iran were Jews.

Prior to the Iranian Revolution or Islamic Revolution in 1979, there were 100,000 Jews in Iran, mostly concentrated in Tehran (60,000), Shiraz (18,000), Kermanshah (4,000), and Isfahan (3,000). Jews were also located in other various cities throughout Iran, including Urmia (800), Salmas (400), Miandoab (60), Baneh, Mashhad, Kashan, Sanandaj, Saqqez, Tazeh Qaleh, Chichakluy-e Bash Qaleh, Garrus, Qaslan, Hamadan, Tuyserkan, Nahavand, Kermanshah, Hashtrud, Zehab, Babol, Siahkal, Damavand, Bushehr, Kazerun, Torbat-e Heydarieh, Sarakhs, Yazd, Arak, and Khorramabad.
 
The Iranian Jewish emigration to Israel is not a recent phenomenon. Of the Iranian Jews living in Israel in the early 1900s, 41% immigrated to British Mandatory Palestine before the establishment of Israel there in 1948; only 15% were admitted between 1975 and 1991. They immigrated chiefly because of religious persecution.

Islamic Republic (1979–present)
At the time of the 1979 Islamic Revolution, 80,000–100,000 Jews were living in Iran. From then on, Jewish emigration from Iran dramatically increased, as about 20,000 Jews left within several months of the revolution alone. The majority of Iran's Jewish population, some 60,000 Jews, emigrated in the aftermath of the revolution, of whom 35,000 went to the United States, 20,000 to Israel, and 5,000 to Europe (mainly to the United Kingdom, France, Denmark, Germany, Italy, and Switzerland).

Some sources put the Iranian Jewish population in the mid and late 1980s as between 50,000 and 60,000. An estimate based on the 1986 census put the figure considerably higher for the same time, around 55,000. From the mid-1990s to the present there has been more uniformity in the figures, with most government sources since then estimating roughly 25,000 Jews remaining in Iran. These less recent official figures are considered bloated, and the Jewish community may not amount to more than 10,000. A 2012 census put the figure at about 8,756.

Ayatollah Khomeini met with the Jewish community upon his return from exile in Paris, when heads of the community, disturbed by the execution of one of their most distinguished representatives, the industrialist Habib Elghanian, arranged to meet him in Qom. At one point he said:

In the holy Quran, Moses, salutations upon him and all his kin, has been mentioned more than any other prophet. Prophet Moses was a mere shepherd when he stood up to the might of pharaoh and destroyed him. Moses, the Speaker-to-Allah, represented pharaoh's slaves, the downtrodden, the mostazafeen of his time.
At the end of the discussion Khomeini declared, "We recognize our Jews as separate from those godless, bloodsucking Zionists" and issued a fatwa decreeing that the Jews were to be protected.

Habib Elghanian was arrested and sentenced to death by an Islamic revolutionary tribunal shortly after the Islamic revolution for charges including corruption, contacts with Israel and Zionism, and "friendship with the enemies of God", and was executed by a firing squad. He was the first Jew and businessman to be executed by the Islamic government. His execution caused fear among the Jewish community and caused many to flee Iran.

Soli Shahvar, professor of Iranian Studies at the University of Haifa describes the process of dispossession : "There were two waves of confiscation of homes, farmlands and factories of Jews in Iran. In the first wave, the authorities seized the properties of a small group of Jews who were accused of helping Zionism financially. In the second wave, authorities confiscated the properties of Jews who had to leave the country after the Revolution. They left everything in fear for their lives and the Islamic Republic confiscated their properties using their absence as an excuse".

During the Iran–Iraq War, which lasted from 1980 to 1988, Iranian Jews were conscripted into the Islamic Republic of Iran Armed Forces, and 13 were killed in the war.

In the Islamic republic, Jews have become more religious. Families who had been secular in the 1970s started adhering to kosher dietary laws and more strictly observed rules against driving on the Shabbat. They stopped going to restaurants, cafes and cinemas and the synagogue became the focal point of their social lives.

Haroun Yashyaei, a film producer and former chairman of the Central Jewish Community in Iran said, "Khomeini didn't mix up our community with Israel and Zionism – he saw us as Iranians."

In June 2007, though there were reports that wealthy expatriate Jews established a fund to offer incentives to Iranian Jews to immigrate to Israel, few took them up on the offer. The Society of Iranian Jews dismissed this act as "immature political enticements" and said that their national identity was not for sale.

Jews in the Islamic Republic of Iran are formally to be treated equally and free to practice their religion. There is even a seat in the Iranian parliament reserved for the representative of the Iranian Jews. However, de facto, discrimination is common.

Current status in Iran

Iran's Jewish community is officially recognized as a religious minority group by the government, and, like the Zoroastrians and Christians, they are allocated one seat in the Iranian Parliament. Siamak Moreh Sedgh is the current Jewish member of the parliament, replacing Maurice Motamed in the 2008 election. In 2000, former Jewish MP Manuchehr Eliasi estimated that at that time there were still 60,000–85,000 Jews in Iran; most other sources put the figure at 25,000. In 2011 the Jewish population numbered 8,756 In 2016 Jewish population numbered 9,826. In 2019 the Jewish Population numbered 8,300 and they constitute 0.01% of Iranian population, a number confirmed by Sergio DellaPergola, a leading Jewish demographer.

Iranian Jews have their own newspaper (called "Ofogh-e-Bina") with Jewish scholars performing Judaic research at Tehran's "Central Library of Jewish Association". The Dr. Sapir Jewish Hospital is Iran's largest charity hospital of any religious minority community in the country; however, most of its patients and staff are Muslim.

Chief Rabbi Yousef Hamadani Cohen was the spiritual leader for the Jewish community of Iran from 1994 to 2007, when he was succeeded by Mashallah Golestani-Nejad. In August 2000, Chief Rabbi Cohen met with Iranian President Mohammad Khatami for the first time. In 2003, Chief Rabbi Cohen and Maurice Motamed met with President Khatami at Yusef Abad Synagogue, which was the first time a President of Iran had visited a synagogue since the Islamic Revolution. Haroun Yashayaei is the chairman of the Jewish Committee of Tehran and leader of Iran's Jewish community. On January 26, 2007, Yashayaei's letter to President Mahmoud Ahmadinejad concerning his Holocaust denial comments brought about worldwide media attention.

The Jews of Iran have been best known for certain occupations like making gold jewelry and dealing in antiques, textiles and carpets.

Conditions
Jews are conscripted into the Iranian Armed Forces like all Iranian citizens. Many Iranian Jews fought during the Iran–Iraq War (1980–1988) as drafted soldiers, and about 15 were killed.

Most Iranian Jews say that they view Iran as their home and are allowed to practice Judaism freely, but there is suspicion and fear too.

They generally hold pro-Iranian stances and refuse to go up to Israel.

Contacts with Jews outside Iran

Rabbis from the Haredi sect Neturei Karta, which has historically been opposed to the existence of Israel have visited Iran on several occasions.
The Jewish Defense Organization, protested against one such visit by members of a Neturei Karta faction after they attended International Conference to Review the Global Vision of the Holocaust in Tehran.

Maurice Motamed, a former Jewish Iranian parliamentarian states that in recent years, the Iranian government has allowed Jewish Iranians to visit their family members in Israel and it has also allowed those Iranians who are living in Israel to return to Iran for a visit.

Limited cultural contacts are also allowed, such as the March 2006 Jewish folk dance festival in Russia, in which a female team from Iran participated.

Thirteen Jews have been executed in Iran since the Islamic revolution, most of them were executed for their alleged connections to Israel. Among them, one of the most prominent Jews of Iran in the 1970s, Habib Elghanian who was the head of the Iranian Jewish community was executed by a firing squad by the Islamic government shortly after the Islamic Revolution of 1979 on the charge of having been in contact with Israel, among others. In May 1998, Jewish businessman Ruhollah Kadkhodah-Zadeh was hanged in prison without a public charge or legal proceeding, apparently for assisting Jews to emigrate.

Iranian Jews are generally allowed to travel to Israel and emigrate abroad, though they must submit passport and visa requests to a special section of the passport office, face restrictions on families leaving en masse, and travels to Israel must be done via a third country. However, the rate of emigration has been low. Between October 2005 and September 2006, 152 Jews left Iran, down from 297 during the same period the previous year, and 183 the year before that. Most of those who left allegedly cited economic and family reasons as their main incentives for leaving. In July 2007, Iran's Jewish community rejected financial emigration incentives to leave Iran. Offers ranging from 5,000 to 30,000 British pounds, financed by a wealthy expatriate Jew with the support of the Israeli government, were turned down by Iran's Jewish leaders. To place the incentives in perspective, the sums offered were up to 3 times or more than the average annual income for an Iranian. However, in late 2007 at least forty Iranian Jews accepted financial incentives offered by Jewish charities for immigrating to Israel.

It has been asserted that the majority of Iranian Jews prefer to stay in Iran because they are allowed to live a comfortable Jewish life there, but Sam Kermanian, who served as Secretary-General of the Iranian American Jewish Federation for fifteen years, disputed this claim, stating that the majority of Iranian Jews are elderly and only speak Persian, and as a result they are less naturally inclined to emigrate. According to Ran Amrani, an Iranian-born Israeli director of a Persian language radio station with close ties inside Iran, wealthy Iranian Jews won't leave because the international sanctions on Iran have so downgraded Iran's currency in value that they would see a massive drop in their standard of living in Israel, with those who own multiple homes in Iran unable to afford a single apartment in Israel, while poor Iranian Jews would find it difficult to restart their lives in Israel in middle age. Amrani claimed that while Jews are allowed to practice their religion, they live in fear of being accused of spying for Israel and that they publicly distance themselves from Israel and Zionism to ensure their own security.

Opinion over the condition of Jews in Iran is divided. One Jewish voice presenting a benevolent view of the Iranian Islamic government and society toward Jews is film producer Haroun Yashayaei, who says "Ayatollah Ruhollah Khomeini didn't mix up our community with Israel and Zionism—he saw us as Iranians."  Privately, many Jews complain of "discrimination, much of it of a social or bureaucratic nature." The Islamic government appoints the officials who run Jewish schools, most of these being Muslims, and until 2015, required that those schools must open on Saturdays, the Jewish Sabbath. Criticism of this policy was the downfall of the last remaining newspaper of the Iranian Jewish community which was closed in 1991 after it criticized government control of Jewish schools. Instead of expelling Jews en masse like in Libya, Iraq, Egypt, and Yemen, the Iranians have adopted a policy of keeping Jews in Iran.

The desire for survival may prompt Iranian Jews to overstate their anti-Israel positions. Their response to the questions regarding Israel have been outright denial of Israel or staying quiet. An example of the dilemma of Iranian Jews can be observed in this example :"We hear the ayatollah say that Israel was cooperating with the Shah and SAVAK, and we would be fools to say we support Israel. So we just keep quiet about it... Maybe it will work out. Anyway, what can we do? This is our home." On September 23, 2021, the wife of the Rabbi of the Jews of Iran gave an interview to a Jewish newspaper

Jewish centers of Iran

Most Jews live in Tehran, the capital. Today Tehran has 11 functioning synagogues, many of them with Hebrew schools. It has two kosher restaurants, an old-age home and a cemetery. There is a Jewish library with 20,000 titles. Traditionally however, Shiraz, Hamedan, Isfahan, Tabriz, Nahawand, Babol and some other cities of Iran were home to large populations of Jews. At present there are 25 synagogues in Iran. Isfahan has a Jewish population of about 1,500, consisting mostly of businesspeople. As of 2015 there were 13 synagogues, including the primary synagogue on Palestine Square. In Esfahan, many Jewish businesses are concentrated in an area called "Jewish Passage".

Legal restrictions
Iranian Jews remain under various discriminatory legal restrictions regarding their position in society. Jews are prohibited from holding significant governmental and decision-making positions. A Jew may not serve on the Guardian Council, as President, or as a military commander. Jews may not serve as judges, and aside from the seat reserved for a Jew in the Majlis, Jews may not become a member of the Majlis through general elections. A Jew may not inherit property from a Muslim. By law, if one member of a Jewish family converts to Islam, that person inherits all family property. Jews also do not have equal rights to Qisas, or retribution, in the Iranian judicial system. For example, if a Jew were to kill a Muslim, the family of the victim would have the right to ask that the death penalty be imposed, but if a Muslim kills a Jew, the penalty would be left to the discretion of the judges with the wishes of the victim's family carrying no legal weight.

Jewish education in Iran
In 1996, there were still three schools in Tehran in which Jews were in a majority, but Jewish principals had been replaced. The school curriculum is Islamic and the Tanakh is taught in Persian, rather than Hebrew. The Ozar Hatorah organization conducts Hebrew lessons on Fridays. The government monitors activities in Jewish schools to ensure that the main language of education is Persian and not Hebrew.

In principle, but with some exceptions, there is little restriction of or interference with the Jewish religious practice; however, education of Jewish children has become more difficult in recent years. The government reportedly allows Hebrew instruction, recognizing that it is necessary for Jewish religious practice. However, it strongly discourages the distribution of Hebrew texts, in practice making it difficult to teach the language. Moreover, the government has required that several Jewish schools remain open on Saturdays, the Jewish Sabbath, in conformity with the schedule of other schools in the school system. Since certain kinds of work (such as writing or using electrical appliances) on the Sabbath violates Jewish law, this requirement to operate the schools has made it difficult for observant Jews both to attend school and adhere to a fundamental tenet of their religion.

Jewish sites of Iran
Many cities in Iran have Jewish or sites related to Judaism in some way. Prominent among these are Tomb of Esther and Mordechai in Hamadan, Tomb of Daniel in Susa, Tomb of Habakkuk in Tuyserkan and the Peyghambarieh mausoleum in Qazvin.

There is a pilgrimage site near Isfahan (Pir Bakran) dedicated to Serah.

There are also tombs of several outstanding Jewish scholars in Iran such as Harav Ohr Shraga in Yazd and Hakham Mullah Moshe Halevi (Moshe-Ha-Lavi) in Kashan, which are also visited by Muslim pilgrims.

On December 16, 2014, authorities in Tehran unveiled a monument to slain Iranian Jewish soldiers who died during the country's long and bitter war with Iraq between 1980 and 1988. Banners showed the images of fallen soldiers, hailed as "martyrs" in Farsi and Hebrew inscriptions. "We are not tenants in this country. We are Iranians, and we have been for 30 centuries," said Ciamak Moresadegh, the Iranian Jewish parliamentarian. "There is a distinction between us as Jews and Israel," added a shopkeeper in the historic city of Isfahan. "We consider ourselves Iranian Jews, and it has nothing to do with Israel whatsoever. This is the country we love."

Demographics
The Jewish Encyclopedia estimated that in 1900 there were 35,000 Persian Jews in Iran (almost all of whom lived in present-day Iran), although other sources estimate somewhat higher numbers for the same time. On the eve of Israel's independence in 1948, there were, by varying estimates, 100,000–150,000 Jews in Iran with relatively few Persian Jews residing outside the country. Today, there are an estimated 300,000–350,000 Jews of full or partial Persian ancestry living predominantly in Israel, with significant communities in the United States and Iran.

Iranian Jews also emigrated to form smaller communities in Western Europe (in particular Paris and London), and in Australia, Canada, and South America. A number of groups of Jews of Persia have split off since ancient times. They have been identified as separate communities, such as the Mountain Jews. In addition, there are a large number of people in Iran who are, or who are the direct descendants of, Jews who converted to Islam or the Baháʼí faith.

Iran
Iran's Jewish population was reduced from 150,000 to 100,000 in 1948 to about 80,000 immediately before the Iranian Revolution, due mostly to immigration to Israel. While immigration to Israel had slowed in the 1970s and the Jewish population of Iran had stabilized, the majority of Iran's remaining Jews left the country in the aftermath of the overthrow of the Shah. In the 2000s, the Jewish population of Iran was estimated by most sources to be 25,000, (sources date from 2006, 2007, and 2008, respectively) though estimates varied, with some as high as 40,000 in 1998. and some as low as 17,000 by 2010 However, the official census in August 2012 indicated that there were only 8,756 Jews still living in Iran. In the 2016 Iranian census, the remaining Jewish population of Iran was 9,826 As of 2021, only 8,500 Jews still live in Iran. After Israel, it is home to the second-largest Jewish population in the Middle East. Notable population centers include Tehran, Isfahan (1,200), and Shiraz. Historically, Jews maintained a presence in many more Iranian cities. Jews are protected in the Iranian constitution and allowed one seat in the Majlis.

Israel 

The largest group of Persian Jews is found in Israel. As of 2007, Israel is home to just over 47,000 Iranian-born Jews and roughly 87,000 Israeli-born Jews with fathers born in Iran. While these numbers add up to about 135,000, when Israelis with more distant or solely maternal Iranian roots are included the total number of Persian Jews in Israel is estimated to be between 200,000-250,000.

A June 2009 Los Angeles Times blog article about Iranian-Israeli Jews showing solidarity with the Iranian protestors said, "The Israeli community of Iranian Jews numbers about 170,000 – including the first generation of Israeli-born – and is deeply proud of its roots." The largest concentration of Persian Jews in Israel is found in the city Holon. In Israel, Persian Jews are classified as Mizrahim. Both former President Moshe Katsav and former Minister of Defense and former head of the opposition in the Knesset Shaul Mofaz are of Persian Jewish origin. Katsav was born in Yazd and Mofaz was born in Tehran.

Since at least the 1980s, Persian Jews in Israel have traditionally tended to vote Likud.

The United States
The United States is home to 60,000–80,000 Iranian Jews, most of whom have settled in the Greater Los Angeles area, in Great Neck, New York and Baltimore, Maryland. Those in metropolitan Los Angeles have settled mostly in the affluent Westside cities of Beverly Hills and Santa Monica and the Los Angeles Westside neighborhoods of Brentwood, Westwood, and West L.A., as well as the San Fernando Valley communities of Tarzana and Encino.

Beverly Hills 

In particular, Persian Jews make up a sizeable proportion of the population of Beverly Hills, California. Persian Jews constitute a great percentage of the 26% of the total population of Beverly Hills that identifies as Iranian-American. Following the 1979 Iranian Revolution, tens of thousands of Persian Jews migrated from Iran, forming one of the wealthiest waves of immigrants to ever come to the United States. The community is credited with revitalizing Beverly Hills and re-developing its architecture, and for the development of ornate mansions across the city.

According to the US Census Bureau's 2010 American Community Survey, 26% of Beverly Hills' 34,000 residents are of Iranian origin. On March 21, 2007, Jimmy Delshad, a Persian Jew who immigrated to the United States in 1958, became the Mayor of Beverly Hills. This election made Delshad one of the highest ranking elected Iranian-American officials in the United States. He once again took the post of mayor of Beverly Hills on March 16, 2010.

Prominent Persian Jewish congregations in the Los Angeles area include Nessah Synagogue and the Eretz-Siamak Cultural Center. Persian Jews also constitute a large part of the membership at Sinai Temple in Westwood, one of the largest Conservative congregations in the United States.

The Iranian American Jewish Federation (IAJF) of Los Angeles is a prominent non-profit organization that has been serving the Iranian Jewish community of Greater Los Angeles for the last forty-one years. IAJF is a leading organization in their efforts to fight local and global Antisemitism, protect Iranian Jews domestically and abroad, promote a unified community, participating in social and public affairs, provide financial and psychosocial assistance to those in need through philanthropic activities, and more.

New York
Kings Point, a village constituting part of Great Neck, has the greatest percentage of Iranians in the United States (approximately 40%). Unlike the Iranian community in Los Angeles, which contains a large number of non-Jewish Iranians, the Iranian population in and around Great Neck is almost entirely Jewish.

Several thousand of the Great Neck area's 10,000 Persian Jews trace their origins to the Iranian city of Mashad, constituting the largest Mashadi community in the United States. Many Mashadi crypto-Jews made their Jewish observances more public again following the rise of the secular Pahlavi dynasty upon performing them privately for almost a century. The Mashadi community in Great Neck operates its own synagogues and community centers, and members typically marry within the community.

The Iranian American Jewish Federation (IAJF) of New York has been serving the Iranian Jewish community for the last sixteen years. The organisation's goal is to be a unifier amongst Iranian Jews in the Greater New York metropolitan area and engagement in philanthropic activities.

Related Jewish communities

Mountain Jews
The Mountain Jews of Azerbaijan and the North Caucasus (primarily Dagestan) are direct descendants of Persian Jews. They took shape as a community after Qajar Iran ceded the areas in which they lived to the Russian Empire as part of the Treaty of Gulistan of 1813. However, they maintained a Judeo-Persian language that shares a great deal of vocabulary and structure with modern Persian. Most Azerbaijani Jews have immigrated to Israel since Azerbaijan gained independence.

Bukharan Jews
Bukharan Jews traditionally speak a dialect of Judeo-Persian and lived mainly in the former emirate of Bukhara (present day Uzbekistan and Tajikistan). Most Bukharan Jews have immigrated to Israel or the United States since the collapse of the Soviet Union.

Lakhloukh Jews
There are estimated to be approximately four dozen Persian Jewish families living in Kazakhstan, which call themselves Lakhloukh and speak Aramaic. They still hold identity papers from Iran, the country their ancestors left almost 80 years ago. These Persian Jews lived near the border of Iran and commonly practiced trade to sustain their communities. The most popular Lakhloukh Jewish family being the Malihi family, whom are all descendants of Jaha Malihi (A noble in the Persian Empire)

Languages
Most Persian Jews speak standard Persian as their primary tongue, but various Jewish languages have been associated with the community over time. They include:
 Dzhidi (Judæo-Persian)
 Bukhori (Judæo-Bukharic)
 Judæo-Golpaygani
 Judæo-Shirazi
 Judæo-Hamedani
 Juhuri language (Judæo-Tat)

In addition, Persian Jews in Israel generally speak Hebrew, and Persian Jews elsewhere will tend to speak the local language (e.g. English in the United States) with sprinkles of Persian and Hebrew.

Many Jews from the Northwest area of Iran speak Lishán Didán or other various dialects of Jewish Neo-Aramaic. Jews from Urmia, Tabriz, Sanandaj, Saqqez, and some other cities all speak various dialects that may or may not be intelligible to each other. There are less than 5,000 known speakers today and the language faces extinction in the next few decades.

Genetics

Genetic studies show that Persian and Iraqi Jews form a distinct cluster amongst the Jewish People and that the MtDNA of Persian Jews and Bukharan Jews descend from a small number of female ancestors.

Another study of L. Hao et al. studied seven groups of Jewish populations with different geographic origin (Ashkenazi, Italian, Greek, Turkish, Iranian, Iraqi, and Syrian) and showed that the individuals all shared a common Middle Eastern background, although they were also genetically distinguishable from each other. In public comments, Harry Ostrer, the director of the Human Genetics Program at NYU Langone Medical Center, and one of the authors of this study, concluded, "We have shown that Jewishness can be identified through genetic analysis, so the notion of a Jewish people is plausible."

An autosomal DNA study carried out in 2010 by Atzmon et al. examined the origin of Iranian, Iraqi, Syrian, Turkish, Greek, Sephardic, and Ashkenazi Jewish communities. The study compared these Jewish groups with 1043 unrelated individuals from 52 worldwide populations. To further examine the relationship between Jewish communities and European populations, 2407 European subjects were assigned and divided into 10 groups based on geographic region of their origin. This study confirmed previous findings of shared Middle Eastern origin of the above Jewish groups and found that "the genetic connections between the Jewish populations became evident from the frequent IBD across these Jewish groups (63% of all shared segments). Jewish populations shared more and longer segments with one another than with non-Jewish populations, highlighting the commonality of Jewish origin. Among pairs of populations ordered by total sharing, 12 out of the top 20 were pairs of Jewish populations, and "none of the top 30 paired a Jewish population with a non-Jewish one". Atzmon concludes that "Each Jewish group demonstrated Middle Eastern ancestry and variable admixture from host population, while the split between Middle Eastern and European/Syrian Jews, calculated by simulation and comparison of length distributions of IBD segments, occurred 100–150 generations ago, which was described as "compatible with a historical divide that is reported to have occurred more than 2500 years ago" as the Jewish community in Iraq and Iran were formed by Jews in the Babylonian and Persian empires during and after Babylonian exile. The main difference between Mizrahi and Ashkenazi/Sephardic Jews was the absence of Southern European components in the former. According to these results, European/Syrian Jewish populations, including the Ashkenazi Jewish community, were formed latter, as a result of the expulsion and migration of Jews from the Land of Israel, during Roman rule. Concerning Ashkenazi Jews, this study found that genetic dates "are incompatible with theories that Ashkenazi Jews are for the most part the direct lineal descendants of converted Khazars or Slavs". Citing Behar, Atzmon states that "Evidence for founder females of Middle Eastern origin has been observed in all Jewish populations based on non overlapping mitochondrial haplotypes with coalescence times >2000 years". The closest people related to Jewish groups were the Palestinians, Bedouins, Druze, Greeks, and Italians. Regarding this relationship, the authors conclude that "These observations are supported by the significant overlap of Y chromosomal haplogroups between Israeli and Palestinian Arabs with Ashkenazi and non-Ashkenazi Jewish populations".

In 2011, Moorjani et al. detected 3%–5% sub-Saharan African ancestry in all eight of the diverse Jewish populations (Ashkenazi Jews, Syrian Jews, Iranian Jews, Iraqi Jews, Greek Jews, Turkish Jews, Italian Jews) that they analyzed. The timing of this African admixture among all Jewish populations was identical The exact date was not determined, but it was estimated to have taken place between 1,600 (4th Century AD) and 3,400 (14th Century BC) years ago. Although African admixture was determined among some South European and Near Eastern populations too, this admixture was found to be younger compared to the Jewish populations. This findings the authors explained as evidence regarding common origin of these 8 main Jewish groups. "It is intriguing that the Mizrahi Irani and Iraqi Jews—who are thought to descend at least in part from Jews who were exiled to Babylon about 2,600 years ago share the signal of African admixture.  A parsimonious explanation for these observations is that they reflect a history in which many of the Jewish groups descend from a common ancestral population which was itself admixed with Africans (most likely Ancient Egyptians), prior to the beginning of the Jewish diaspora that occurred in 8th to 6th century BC" the authors concludes.

Medical conditions
Patients with prolonged paralysis following administration of the anaesthetic succinylcholine are often diagnosed with Pseudocholinesterase which is a clinically silent condition in individuals who are not exposed to exogenous sources of choline esters. One possible outcome beyond prolonged general paralysis is paralysis of the muscles control respiratory function. This condition is found in the general population at a rate of 1 in 3000, while the condition is found in Persian Jews at a rate of 1 in 10.

List of Persian Jews

Biblical
 Daniel
 Esther
 Ezra
 Habakkuk
 Haggai
 Mordechai
 Nehemiah
 Zerubbabel

Pre-modern era
 Mashallah ibn Athari – Persian astrologer and astronomer
 Sa'ad al-Dawla – physician and statesman
 Rashid al-Din – doctor, writer, and historian
 Benjamin Nahawandi – Karaite scholar of the early Middle Ages
 Meulana Shahin Shirazi – early Persian poet
 Muhammad ibn Muhammad Tabrizi – philosopher and translator, converted to Islam
 Munabbih ibn Kamil - a companion of Muhammad, converted to Islam
 Abu Ubaidah - religious scholar
 Ibn al-Rawandi - prominent philosopher, religious scholar 
 Shushandukht - Sassanian queen consort, mother of Bahram V
 Ifra Hormizd - Sassanid noblewoman, mother of Shapur II
 Maryam Khanom - Qajar royal consort 
 Masarjawaih - Persian physician 
 Abu Isa - self-proclaimed Jewish prophet 
 Mar-Zutra II - Jewish exilarch
 Qavam family - one of the most influential families during the Qajar dynasty
 Imrani - Persian poet
 Yudghan - religious leader from Hamadan
 Mirza Abolhassan Khan Ilchi - Iranian statesman, served as ambassador and the Minister of Foreign Affairs
 Baba'i ben Lotf - Persian poet, author of the first Judeo-Persian chronicle
 Anan ben David - founder of the Karaite Movement
 Daniel al-Kumisi - prominent scholar of Karaite Judaism
 Aphrahat - Persian saint, converted to Christianity

Politics and military
 David Alliance, Baron Alliance – Iranian-born British businessman; Liberal Democrat politician
 Michael Ben-Ari – Israeli politician and current member of the Knesset
 Makan Delrahim – United States Assistant Attorney General for the United States Department of Justice Antitrust Division under the Trump Administration 
 Jimmy Delshad – former two-term mayor of Beverly Hills
 Manuchehr Eliasi – former Jewish member of the Majlis
 Eitan Ben Eliyahu – former Major General in the Israeli Defence Forces
 Saeed Emami – former conservative Deputy Minister of the Ministry of Intelligence (convert to Islam)
 Naser Makarem Shirazi - Iranian Shia religious leader (convert to Islam)
 Reza Hekmat - Prime Minister of Iran (convert to Islam)
 Aziz Daneshrad - political activist
 Dan Halutz – former chief of staff of the Israel Defense Forces
 Anna Kaplan – American politician and current member of the New York State Senate
 Moshe Katsav – former President of Israel
 Shaul Mofaz – former Israeli Minister of Defense; current chairman of the Kadima Party in the Knesset
 Maurice Motamed – former Jewish member of the Majlis of Iran
 David Nahai – former head of the Los Angeles Department of Water and Power
 Abie Nathan – humanitarian and peace activist
 Siamak Moreh Sedgh – Jewish member of the Majlis of Iran
 Haroun Yashayaei – chairman of the board of the Tehran Jewish Committee and leader of Iran's Jewish community
 Mordechai Zar – Israeli politician and former member of the Knesset
 Ellie Cohanim – Deputy Special Envoy to Monitor and Combat Anti-Semitism at the United States Department of State
 Dalya Attar - American politician 
 Moshfegh Hamadani - political journalist 
 Tali Farhadian - attorney and politician
 Esther Shkalim - Israeli poet, researcher 
 Shmuel Hayyim - journalist, politician
 Shula Keshet - political activist and writer
 Nitsana Darshan-Leitner - attorney, activist
 Meirav Ben-Ari - Israeli politician, member of the Knesset 
 Sharon Nazarian - Iranian-born Senior Vice President of International Affairs for the ADL
 David Rokni - Israeli colonel
 Galit Distel-Atbaryan - Israeli politician, member of the Knesset 
 Eliezer Avtabi - former Israeli politician 
 Sharon Roffe Ofir - Israeli journalist and politician 
 Payam Akhavan - international lawyer (convert to the Bahá’í faith)
 David Peyman - attorney, worked for the United States Department of State

Science and academia
 Abbas Amanat – professor of history at Yale University (born to a family of Jewish descent that converted to the Baháʼí Faith)
 Shaul Bakhash – professor of Iranian studies at George Mason University
 Aaron Cohen-Gadol – neurosurgeon specializing in surgical treatment of brain tumors and aneurysms
 Pejman Salimpour - professor, physician 
 Pedram Salimpour - physician, entrepreneur 
 Farshid Delshad – historical-comparative linguistics in German
 Avshalom Elitzur – physicist and philosopher
 Soleiman Haim – compiled an early and influential Persian language dictionary
 Hakim Yazghel Haqnazar – court physician
 Iraj Lalezari – academic and chemist
 Habib Levy – historian best known for his extensive research on the history of Jews in Iran; author of Comprehensive History of the Jews of Iran: The Outset of the Diaspora.
 Amnon Netzer – professor of the history and culture of Iranian Jews
 Samuel Rahbar – discoverer of HbA1C
 David B. Samadi – expert in robotic oncology
 Saba Soomekh – professor of religious studies and Middle Eastern History at UCLA, and author of books on Iranian Jewish culture
 Ehsan Yarshater – historian & founder of the Encyclopedia Iranica (born to Jewish parents who converted to the Baháʼí Faith)
 Moussa B. H. Youdim - Israeli neurologist, neuropharmacologist
 Babak Azizzadeh - cosmetic surgeon 
 Armin Tehrany - orthopedic surgeon
 Simon Ourian -plastic surgeon

Business and economics
 David Alliance – British businessman
 Mike Amiri - American fashion designer 
 Asadollah Asgaroladi – Iranian billionaire (convert to Islam)
 Habibollah Asgaroladi – leading Iranian conservative politician (convert to Islam)
 Jon Bakhshi - American restauranter
 J. Darius Bikoff – founder and CEO of Energy Brands
 Kiana Danial – personal investing and wealth management expert, CEO of Invest Diva
 Mandana Dayani - attorney, entrepreneur
 Henry Elghanayan - real estaste developer New York City
 Habib Elghanian – prominent businessman executed by the Islamic Republic
 Ghermezian family – billionaire shopping mall developers
 Manucher Ghorbanifar - former SAVAK agent, central figure in the Iran-Contra affair
 Kamran Hakim – real estate developer in New York City
 Moussa Kermanian – real estate developer in Los Angeles and journalist
 Neil Kadisha – businessman
 Nasser David Khalili – billionaire property developer and art collector
 Khwaja Israel Sarhad and Khwaja Fanous Kalantar, landowners, diplomats, and tycoons hailing from Isfahan, Iran (New Julfa) (see Khwaja).
 Saul Maslavi – president and CEO of Jovani Fashion
 Isaac Larian – American billionaire, chief executive officer of MGA Entertainment
 Justin Mateen – co-founder and former chief marketing officer of Tinder dating app
 David Merage – co-founder of Hot Pockets snack food company
 Paul Merage – co-founder of Hot Pockets snack food company
 Joseph Moinian, New York City real estate developer
 Ezri Namvar - Iranian-born businessman and convicted criminal
 Fred Ohebshalom – founder of Empire Management Real Estate 
 Joseph Parnes – investment advisor
 Erwin David Rabhan - businessman, longtime friend of Jimmy Carter
 Sean Rad – co-founder and former CEO of Tinder dating app
 Assadollah Rashidian - businessman, played a critical role in the 1953 Overthrow of Mohammed Mossadegh
 Nouriel Roubini – economist
 Ben Shaoul – co-founder of Magnum Real Estate Group
 Joel Simkhai – founder of Grindr dating app
 Mahbod Moghadam - co-founder of Everipedia, co-founder of Genius
 Sam Mizrahi - Canadian real estate developer 
 Victor Haghani - American financier
 Fraydun Manocherian - Manhattan real estate developer
 Richard Saghian - Founder of Fashion Nova
 Daniel Negari - founder of .xyz domain 
 Mike Kohan - founder of Kohan Retail Investment Group
 Habib Sabet - Iranian industrialist (convert to the Bahá’í Faith)
 Essie Sakhai - art dealer, businessman 
 Ely Sakhai - art dealer, owner of several Lower Manhattan art galleries
 Sasson Khakshouri - businessman, founder of the international Kremlin Cup
 Jack Mahfar - Iranian-born businessman
 Albert Hakim - businessman, figure in the Iran-Contra affair
 Sam Eshaghoff - American real estate developer
 Hootan Yaghoobzadeh - co-founder of Staple Street Capital
 Eli Zelkha – entrepreneur, venture capitalist, professor, and inventor of ambient intelligence

Art and entertainment
 Isaac Larian - creator of Bratz dolls 
 Dan Ahdoot – stand-up comedian
 Jonathan Ahdout – actor
 Hossein Amanat – architect, designer of the Azadi Tower in Tehran (born to a family of Jewish descent that converted to the Baháʼí Faith)
Jojo Anavim - artist
Yossi Banai – Israeli performer, singer, and actor
Richard Danielpour – composer
 Yuval Delshad- film director
 David Diaan – actor, producer, screenwriter
Irán Eory - Iranian-born Mexican actress and model
Chohreh Feyzdjou - French-Iranian painter
Hamid Gabbay - Iranian-born architect
Roya Hakakian – writer and poet
Mor Karbasi – singer
Kamran Khavarani - architect, painter
Harmony Korine - director, screenwriter
Ben Maddahi - prominent American music executive
Faranak Margolese – writer, best known as author of Off the Derech
Jamie Masada – comedian and businessman. Founder of the Laugh Factory
 Heshmat Moayyad - writer, translator (convert to Bahá’í Faith)
 Dora Levy Mossanen – author of historical fiction
 Moze Mossanen - Canadian film director and producer
 Ottessa Moshfegh - American author
 Gina Nahai – writer
Morteza Neidavoud - musician
 Adi Nes – photographer
Dorit Rabinyan - Israeli writer, screenwriter
 Rita – Israeli pop star
Maer Roshan - writer, entrepreneur
Hooshang Seyhoun - prominent Iranian architect (convert to the Bahá’í Faith)
Lior Shamriz - filmmaker
 Shahram Shiva – performance poet
 Dalia Sofer – writer
Sarah Solemani - English actress
 Bahar Soomekh – Iranian-born American actress
 Tami Stronach – choreographer
 Subliminal – Israeli hip-hop singer
 The Shadow – Israeli hip-hop singer and right-wing activist
 Elie Tahari – high-end fashion designer
 Shaun Toub – Iranian-born American actor, recipient of the Sephard award at the Los Angeles Sephardic Film Festival
 Elham Yaghoubian- writer
 Bob Yari – film producer

Religion
 Eliyahu Bakshi-Doron – previous Sephardic Chief Rabbi of Israel
 Shmuley Boteach – American rabbi
 Yousef Hamadani Cohen – former chief rabbi of Iran
 Uriel Davidi – former chief rabbi of Iran
 Mashallah Golestani-Nejad – current chief rabbi of Iran
 Lutfu'lláh Hakím – Baháʼí leader (born to a family of Jewish descent that converted to the Baháʼí Faith)
 Menahem Shemuel Halevy – Iranian rabbi 
 Yedidia Shofet – former chief rabbi of Iran
 Younes Hamami Lalehzar - prominent religious leader
 Eliyahu Ben Haim - Sephardic rabbi 
 Ben Zion Abba Shaul - rabbi, religious scholar
 Ezra Zion Melamed - biblical scholar

Miscellaneous
 Menashe Amir – Persian-language broadcaster in Israel
 Soleyman Binafard – wrestler
 Hanina Mizrahi - educator, public figure
 Ezra Frech - American Paralympic athlete 
 Janet Kohan-Sedq – track and field athlete
 Shamsi Hekmat – women's rights activist who pioneered reforms on women's status in Iran. Founded the first Iranian Jewish women's organization (Sazman Banovan Yahud i Iran) in 1947.
 Leandra Medine, author, blogger, and humor writer best known for Man Repeller, an independent fashion and lifestyle website
 Homa Sarshar – journalist, author, and feminist activist. Columnist for Zan-e-Ruz magazine Kayhan daily newspaper (1964–1973).
 Albert Elay Shaltiel – philanthropist, founder and director of ILAI Fund
 Houshang Mashian - Iranian-Israeli chess master 
 Eliezer Kashani - member of Irgun
 Eli Avivi - founder of the micronation Akhzivland

See also
 
 Iran–Israel relations
 History of the Jews in Iran
 History of the Jews under Muslim rule
 Antisemitism in Islam
 Islamic–Jewish relations
 Judæo-Iranian languages
 Judæo-Persian languages
 Judeo-Persian dialects
 Kaifeng Jews – a small community of Persian Jewish descent which lives in Kaifeng, a city in the Henan province of China
 List of Asian Jews
 Mandaeans
 Mountain Jews
 Persian people
 Purim
 Religious minorities in Iran
 Allahdad incident
 Shiraz blood libel
 1999 Arrest and trial of 13 Jews in Iran
 Tehran Jewish Committee
 Dr. Sapir Hospital and Charity Center
 List of Chief Rabbis of Iran
 List of synagogues in Iran
 List of Synagogues in Tehran
 Jews of Iran
 30 Years After
 Madare sefr darajeh
 International Holocaust Cartoon Competition

References

Notes

Citations

Sources 

 
 
 "Iran. 1997" (1997). Encyclopaedia Judaica (CD-ROM Edition Version 1.0). Ed. Cecil Roth. Keter Publishing House. 
 
 
 
 
 
 
 
 Karmel Melamed, Persian Jews politicking on Rodeo Drive JTA International Wire News Service, February 20, 2007.
 Houman M. Sarshar: The Jews of Iran. The History, Religion, and Culture of a Community in the Islamic World. I.B. Tauris, London/New York 2014,

External links 
 Sephardic Studies, Iran
 History of the Iranian Jews
 
 
 Former Jewish Ghetto in Tehran

 Media
 
 Pictures of Persian Jews 
 Iranian Jewish Chronicle Magazine
 Iran Chamber Society The Cyrus Prism: The Decree of return for the Jews, 539 BCE, edited by Charles F. Horne,
 In Search of Cyrus the Great, directed by Cyrus Kar, in production. (preview only)
Cenrer for Iranian Jewish Oral History Archive on the Digital collections of Younes and Soraya Nazarian Library, University of Haifa

 Miscellaneous
 Tehran Jewish Committee
 persian Jewish TV Committee

 
 
Sephardi Jews topics
Jewish ethnic groups
 
Ethnic groups in the Middle East